Maccabi Hakoah Futsal Club is an Australian futsal club based in Sydney, New South Wales. They play in the F-League which is the top tier of Australian Futsal. The club was founded by Gareth Naar in 2008.

History
In 2011 the club was the inaugural winner of the newly formed F-League competition. Due to their success the club qualified to participate in the 2012 AFC Futsal Club Championship.

Current squad

Club honors
 2011 F-League Champions
 NSW Super League Minor Premiers
 NSW Super League Final Series Runners Up
 NZ National League Champions

References

External links
F-League official website
Official website

Futsal clubs in Australia
Futsal clubs established in 2008
2008 establishments in Australia